Devonte Devon Brown (born August 20, 1992) is an American professional basketball player for BC Tallinna Kalev of the Estonian Korvpalli Meistriliiga.  He is a 6 ft 2 in (1.93 m) tall point guard.

College career
Brown played college basketball at Indiana State University, with the Sycamores, from 2011 to 2016; red-shirting in the 2011–12 season.  He led the Sycamores to a 4-yr record of 71–59 (.546) and 2 post-season tournament berths (2x NIT).

He twice led the Sycamores in scoring and currently stands 24th in career scoring (1,170 pts), 10th in career defensive rebounds (371), 2nd in games played (130), 4th in made free throws (431), and 7th in minutes played (3,306).

Professional career
After going undrafted in the 2016 NBA draft, Brown signed with OKK Sloboda Tuzla of the Premijer liga BiH; he started 21 of 29 games, averaging 7.9 points and leading them to a 17–13 record, good for fourth place in league play.

On June 19, 2017, Brown signed with German club Paderborn Baskets.

Awards and accomplishments

College
2x All-Missouri Valley Conference Second Team: (2015, 2016)
2x Missouri Valley Conference Most Improved Player (2016) 
 2x NABC All-District Second Team: (2015, 2016)
 Missouri Valley Conference Player of the Week (2016)

References

External links
Indiana State Sycamores bio
College stats @ sports-reference.com
Profile @ eurobasket.com

1992 births
Living people
American expatriate basketball people in Bosnia and Herzegovina
American expatriate basketball people in Estonia
American expatriate basketball people in Germany
American men's basketball players
Basketball players from Texas
Indiana State Sycamores men's basketball players
OKK Sloboda Tuzla players
Sportspeople from Killeen, Texas
Point guards